Bre-X was a group of companies in Canada. Bre-X bought the Busang site in March 1993 and in October 1995 announced significant amounts of gold had been discovered, sending its stock price soaring. Originally a penny stock, its stock price reached a peak at CAD$286.50 (split adjusted) in May 1996 on the Toronto Stock Exchange (TSE), with a total capitalization of over CAD $6 billion. Bre-X Minerals collapsed in 1997 after the gold samples were found to be fraudulent.

Bre-X's gold resource at Busang was a massive fraud.  Encouraging gold values were intersected in many drill-holes and the project received a positive technical assessment by Kilborn. Crushed core samples had been falsified by salting with gold that has a wide variety of characteristics that had been subjected to mineralogical examination by Bre-X's consultants. In fact in an old report, found in Bre-X files, a mineralogist had reported that some gold particles in Busang samples had the darker yellow skin compared to the interior and some had delicate morphologies composed of electrum. The yellow rims result from selective leaching of silver from the surface of gold particle during river transport or during supergene (in-situ) processes. Electrum is inconsistent with an alluvial origin. The mineralogy gave no indication that it was alluvial gold and was consistent with the assumed origin of the samples. None of the mineralogists who studied the gold grains gave any indication that the gold was not consistent with a hard rock origin. The salting of crushed core samples with gold constitutes the most elaborate fraud in the history of mining. In 1997, Bre-X collapsed and its shares became worthless in one of the biggest stock scandals in Canadian history, and the biggest mining scandal of all time.

History

David Walsh founded Bre-X Minerals Ltd. in 1989 as a subsidiary of Bresea Resources Ltd. The company did not make a significant profit before 1993, when Walsh followed the advice of geologist John Felderhof and bought a property in the middle of a jungle near the Busang River in Kalimantan, Indonesia. The first estimate of the site by its project manager (Filipino geologist Michael de Guzman) was approximately 2 million troy ounces.

The estimate of the site's worth increased over time; in 1995 it was 30 million ounces (850 metric tons); in 1996, 60 million (1,700 metric tons); finally, in 1997, 70 million ounces. The stock was originally listed on the Alberta Stock Exchange in 1989, and subsequently in 1996 on the Toronto Stock Exchange and NASDAQ.

Some other mineral companies, including Placer Dome, organized failed takeovers, but the Indonesian government of President Suharto also got involved. Stating that a small company like Bre-X could not exploit the site by itself, the Indonesians initially suggested that Bre-X share the site with the large Canadian mining firm Barrick Gold, in association with Suharto's daughter Siti Hardiyanti Rukmana.  Bre-X hired Suharto's son Sigit Hardjojudanto to handle their side of the affair. Bob Hasan, another Suharto acquaintance, negotiated a deal whereby Bre-X would have a 45% share, Freeport-McMoRan Copper & Gold would run the mine, and Hasan would get a cut as well. Bre-X would have the land rights for 30 years. The deal was announced February 17, 1997 and Freeport-McMoRan began their initial due diligence evaluation of the site.

Fraud exposed
The fraud began to unravel rapidly on March 19, 1997, when Filipino Bre-X geologist Michael de Guzman reportedly committed suicide by jumping from a helicopter in Indonesia.
A body was found four days later in the jungle, missing the hands and feet, "surgically removed". In addition, the body was reportedly mostly eaten by animals. (According to journalist John McBeth, a body had gone missing from the morgue of the town from which the helicopter flew. The remains of "de Guzman" were found only 400 metres from a logging road. No one saw the body except another Filipino geologist who claimed it was de Guzman. And one of the five women who considered themselves his wife was receiving monetary payments from somebody long after the supposed death of de Guzman.) 

A week later, on March 26, 1997, the American firm Freeport-McMoRan, a prospective partner in developing Busang, announced that its own due-diligence core samples, led by Australian geologist Colin Jones, showed "insignificant amounts of gold". A frenzied sell-off of shares ensued and Suharto postponed signing the mining deal. Bre-X demanded more reviews and commissioned a review of the test drilling. Results were not favorable to them, and on April 1, 1997, Bre-X refused to comment. Canadian gold analyst Egizio Bianchini, of BMO Nesbitt Burns, considered the rumors "preposterous". A third-party independent company, Strathcona Minerals, was brought in to make its own analysis. They published their results on May 4, 1997: the Busang ore samples had been salted with gold dust. The lab's tests showed that gold in one hole had been shaved off gold jewelry though it has never been proved at what stage this gold had been added to those samples. This gold also occurred in quantities that did not support the actual original assays. Trading in Bre-X was soon suspended on the TSE and NASDAQ, and the company filed for bankruptcy protection.

Aftermath
By May, Bre-X faced a number of lawsuits and angry investors who had lost billions. Among the major losers were three Canadian public sector organizations: The Ontario Municipal Employees Retirement Board (loss of $45 million), the Caisse de dépôt et placement du Québec, the Quebec Public Sector Pension fund ($70 million), and the Ontario Teachers' Pension Plan ($100 million). There was fallout in the Canadian financial sector also; the fraud proved a major embarrassment for Peter Munk, the head of Barrick Gold, as well as for the then-head of the Toronto Stock Exchange (resulting in his ousting by 1999), and began a tumultuous realignment of the Canadian stock exchanges.

Bre-X went bankrupt November 5, 1997 although some of its subsidiaries continued until 2003.

Walsh moved to the Bahamas in 1998, still professing his innocence. Two masked gunmen broke into his home in Nassau, tying him up, and threatened to shoot him unless he turned over all his money. The incident ended peacefully but three weeks later, on June 4, 1998, Walsh died of a brain aneurysm.

In 1999 the Royal Canadian Mounted Police (RCMP) announced it was ending its investigation without laying criminal charges against anyone. Critics charged that the RCMP was underfunded and understaffed to handle complex criminal fraud cases, and also charged that Canadian laws in this area were inadequate. However, despite the dropping of criminal charges, civil class action suits against Bre-X directors, advising financial firms and Kilborn continued.

In May 1999, the Ontario Securities Commission charged Felderhof with insider trading. No other member of Bre-X's board of directors, or others associated with the Busang project, were charged by the OSC. The OSC admitted that there is no evidence that Felderhof was either involved in the fraud or was aware of the fraud. The trial was suspended in April 2001 when the OSC tried to have presiding judge Justice Peter Hryn removed for alleged bias against the prosecution. This was denied by an independent judge, and on December 10, 2003 the appeal was also denied by a panel of judges.

The trial resumed in 2005. Felderhof attended, without testifying, a number of the Court hearings as the six-year case made its way through the system. The basis of the OSC action as well as the civil class-action suits is the alleged existence of numerous and obvious "red flags", as detailed by Strathcona Minerals, which should have been recognized.

Begun in 2001, the trial of John Felderhof was concluded on Tuesday, July 31, 2007, with a not-guilty verdict of illegal insider trading. Days after the verdict, the OSC also decided not to appeal the decision, a landmark victory for Felderhof and his lawyer, Toronto-based Joseph Groia. A class-action lawsuit was discontinued by court order in early 2014; $3.5 million (CAN) damages were donated to charity and the University of Ottawa since funds were deemed too low to be meaningfully distributed amongst the large number of plaintiffs.

Felderhof passed away on October 28, 2019, in Manila, Philippines, at the age of 79.

The Bre-X mining fraud convinced Canadians to regulate professional geology in Canada.  The Securities regulation National Instrument 43-101 was created in the wake of the Bre-X fraud to protect investors from unsubstantiated mineral project disclosures.

Books and articles
 The Bre-X Fraud by Douglas Goold and Andrew Willis, McClelland and Stewart (1997)
 Fool's Gold: The Making of a Global Market Fraud by Brian Hutchinson (pub. by Alfred A. Knopf, 1998)
 Bre-X: sebungkah emas di kaki pelangi by Bondan Winarno.  (1997)
 Bre-X: Gold Today, Gone Tomorrow by James Whyte and Vivian Danielson
 Indonesian Gold by Kerry B. Collison — a fictionalised account
 New Perspectives on Busang by Phillip Hellman, Parts 1 & 2, The Northern Miner, May 2002
 Friction by Anna Tsing (2005, Princeton University Press)
 Fever: The Dark Mystery of the Bre-X Gold Rush by Jennifer Wells
 Bre-X, The Inside Story by Diane Francis (pub by Key Porter Books, 1997)
 Reporter. Forty Years Covering Asia by John McBeth, Talisman Publishing, Singapore, 2011. 

Film
The film Gold'', a dramatization derived from the Bre-X story, was released world-wide on January 27, 2017. For legal reasons, and to enhance the appeal of the film to American audiences, the film's producers denied that the film was in any way connected to the Canadian Bre-X story.

Notes and references

External links
 Official website post scandal & Film Use
 
 CBC Digital Archives - Stranger than Fiction: The Bre-X Gold Scandal
 Ontario Securities Commission News Release February 9, 2006
 Reprint of Jungle Fever, Richard Behar's on-the-ground reportage of the Bre-X scandal, first published in Fortune Magazine
 September 17, 2007: Bre-X geologist says mine might contain gold

Defunct mining companies of Canada
Fraud in Canada
Gold rushes
Corporate scandals
OMERS companies
Non-renewable resource companies disestablished in 2003
1997 in economics
Non-renewable resource companies established in 1989
Canadian companies disestablished in 2003
1989 establishments in Alberta
2003 disestablishments in Alberta
Companies that have filed for bankruptcy in Canada